The Al-Khor Stadium is a multi-purpose stadium in the coastal town of Al Khor, Qatar, that is home to Al-Khor Sports Club. The capacity of the stadium is 45,330, making it one of the larger stadiums in the Qatar Stars League. After the QSL, it will be reduced to a capacity of 25,500.

References

Khor Stadium
Khor Stadium
Khor Stadium